The Trumpchi Emkoo is a compact crossover SUV produced by Chinese automobile manufacturer GAC Group and sold under the Trumpchi brand since 2022. It is the second vehicle of the Trumpchi Shadow (影) series, after the Empow compact sports sedan.

The Emkoo is available in two ICE-powered models and a hybrid model.

Overview

The Trumpchi Emkoo was previewed by the Vision Emkoo concept car revealed in November 2021 at Auto Guangzhou.

The production model Trumpchi Emkoo debuted in April 2022, with similar yet toned-down styling compared to the 2021 concept. The Emkoo went on sale in China in August 2022 at a starting price of RMB 132,000 (US$19,450).

Specifications

Powertrain
There are two ICE models of the Trumpchi Emkoo. The entry-level model is powered by a 1.5 liter turbocharged engine, producing 177 hp and 270 Nm of torque and is paired with a 7-speed dual-clutch transmission, while the mid-level model is powered by a 2.0 liter turbocharged engine, producing 252 hp and 400 Nm of torque and has an 8-speed automatic transmission.

The Emkoo hybrid model is powered by a 2.0 liter engine, outputting 140 hp and 180 Nm, with an electric motor co-developed by GAC and Toyota called the G-MC 2.0 system. This model uses a 2-speed dedicated hybrid transmission.

Technology
The Trumpchi Emkoo features an ADiGO 5.0 advanced driver-assistance system and a  central screen using a Qualcomm Snapdragon 8155 chip.

References

Crossover sport utility vehicles
Compact sport utility vehicles
Hybrid sport utility vehicles
2020s cars
Cars introduced in 2022
Cars of China
Emkoo